Stranton Grange Cemetery is located in Tanfield Road, Stranton, Hartlepool. It is also the site of Hartlepool Crematorium. It opened in May 1912. It now covers over 30 acres in extent.

War graves
The cemetery contains the war graves of 43 Commonwealth service personnel of the First World War and 132 of the Second World War. Those of the former war are scattered throughout the cemetery where, after that war, the Commonwealth War Graves Commission erected a Cross of Sacrifice in the main entrance of the cemetery. Early in the second war the local authorities set aside ground behind the Cross for war service burials, on which has grown the present War Graves Plot.

Notable interments
 Theophilus Jones, age 29, Private, 18th Battalion, Durham Light Infantry, the first soldier to die on English soil as a result of enemy action in 200 years when the Hartlepools were bombarded by German ships in 1914.

References

External links
 
 Stranton Grange Cemetery and Crematorium Services
 Stranton Grange Crematorium
 Stranton Grange Cemetery burials 1920–1944

Cemeteries in England
Hartlepool
1912 establishments in England